The 1932 New York state election was held on November 8, 1932, to elect the governor, the lieutenant governor, the state comptroller, the attorney general, the chief judge, a U.S. Senator and two U.S. Representatives-at-large, as well as all members of the New York State Assembly and the New York State Senate.

History
By a re-apportionment in 1932, the state of New York received two more seats in the U.S. House of Representatives, but instead of redistricting the congressional districts, the additional congressmen were elected at-large on the state ticket until the election of 1944.

The Socialist Labor state convention met on April 29, a day before the party's national convention, in New York City, and nominated Aaron M. Orange for governor; and Emil F. Teichert for lieutenant governor.

The Communist state convention met on June 19 at Schenectady, New York, and nominated Israel Amter for governor; and Henry Shepard, a "Harlem Negro", for Lieutenant Governor

The Socialist state convention met on July 3 at Utica, New York, and nominated Louis Waldman for the third time to run for governor; and Frank R. Crosswaith for lieutenant governor. Crosswaith however declined, instead running for Congress in Harlem, and Charles W. Noonan was substituted on the ticket.

The Law Preservation state convention met on October 3 at Syracuse, New York and nominated the Rev. Dr. John F. Vichert, of Rochester, a professor of practical theology at Colgate Divinity School, for governor; H. Westlake Coons for lieutenant governor; Ralph H. Culley, of Rochester, for attorney general; Francis A. Walters, of Rome, for comptroller; and Dr. D. Leigh Colvin for U.S. Senator. At first Vichert declined, but a few days later changed his mind.

The Republican state convention met on October 4 at Buffalo, New York, and nominated Colonel William J. "Wild Bill" Donovan for governor; and Assistant U.S. Secretary of War F. Trubee Davison for lieutenant governor; Mayor of Rochester, New York Charles S. Owen for comptroller; Moses G. Hubbard, of Utica, for attorney general; George Z. Medalie for the U.S. Senate; and the incumbent Chief Judge Cuthbert W. Pound to succeed himself.

The Democratic state convention met on October 4 at Albany, New York, and nominated Lieutenant Governor Herbert H. Lehman for governor to succeed Governor Franklin D. Roosevelt who had been nominated for U.S. President; M. William Bray for lieutenant governor; and re-nominated the other incumbent state officers, among them the Republican Chief Judge Cuthbert W. Pound.

Result
The whole Democratic ticket was elected in another landslide.

The incumbents Tremaine, Bennett, Pound and Wagner were re-elected.

Notes

Sources
Result: ROOSEVELT'S LEAD IN STATE 596,996 in NYT on December 10, 1932
Result (Prohibition only): Vote for Prohibition candidates at Prohibitionists.org
Results-New York Red Book 1933

See also
New York gubernatorial elections
New York state elections
1932 United States presidential election
New York City mayoral elections#1932

 
1932
November 1932 events in the United States